Charles John "Tim" Rawlings (4 November 1932 – 28 September 2014) was an English footballer. A half-back, he made 231 league appearances in a 15-year career in the Football League. He made the bulk of these appearances for Walsall in between 1956 and 1963, but also had six years without a game at West Bromwich Albion, and also spent two years at Port Vale. He helped Walsall to win two consecutive promotions from the Fourth Division to the Second Division in 1959–60 and 1960–61.

Career
Rawlings played for Erdington Albion, before joining West Bromwich Albion in 1950. He spent six seasons at The Hawthorns, but was not handed his First Division debut either by Jack Smith or Vic Buckingham, and was instead allowed to leave the "Throstles" for Walsall in 1956. The "Saddlers" finished 15th in the Third Division South in 1956–57 under the stewardship of John Love. New boss Bill Moore could only take the club to a 20th-place finish in 1957–58, which led them to become founder members of the Fourth Division. They then posted a sixth-place finish in 1958–59, six points and two places outside of the promotion places. Walsall then topped the division in 1959–60 by a five-point margin, to win a place in the Third Division. Walsall then finished second in 1960–61, six points behind champions Bury, to win a second successive promotion. The Fellows Park club finished 14th in the Second Division in 1961–62, before suffering relegation in 1962–63 due to their inferior goal average to 20th placed Charlton Athletic. In his seven years at the club Rawlings played a total of 201 league games, scoring five goals.

Rawlings was signed by Port Vale manager Freddie Steele for a £4,000 fee in June 1963. He made 22 appearances in the 1963–64 season, and played 14 games in the 1964–65 campaign, as the "Valiants" suffered relegation out of the Third Division under Jackie Mudie. Rawlings was given a free transfer to Southern League side Nuneaton Borough in April 1965. He later turned out for hometown club Coleshill Town. He later worked for Lucas Industries.

Career statistics
Source:

Honours
Walsall
Football League Fourth Division: 1959–60
Football League Third Division second-place promotion: 1960–61

References

1932 births
2014 deaths
People from Coleshill, Warwickshire
English footballers
Association football midfielders
West Bromwich Albion F.C. players
Walsall F.C. players
Port Vale F.C. players
Nuneaton Borough F.C. players
Coleshill Town F.C. players
English Football League players
Southern Football League players